Stainton is a village and civil parish in the Metropolitan Borough of Doncaster in South Yorkshire, England. 

The parish has a population of 269, increasing marginally to 271 at the 2011 Census. and is historically part of the West Riding of Yorkshire.

Stainton is recorded in the 1086 Domesday Book. Stainton grew in the 19th century, providing homes for miners at Maltby.

Stainton ecclesiastical parish is within the Diocese of Sheffield. The parish church of St. Winifred, a Grade II* listed building, dates from the 12th century.

The current Stainton lord of the manor (as of 2015), is the 13th Earl of Scarbrough. The cricketer Freddie Trueman was born at Scotch Springs in Stainton.

See also
Listed buildings in Stainton, South Yorkshire

References

External links

"The Ancient Parish of Stainton", Genuki.org.uk. Retrieved 31 March 2015

Villages in Doncaster
Civil parishes in South Yorkshire